Overdrive is a Serbian hardcore punk/metalcore band from Zrenjanin.

History 
The band was formed in 1992 by Dragan Midorović (guitar). The band performed as a cover band with various band lineups until the arrival of Damir Milutinov (vocals) and Aleksandar Midorović (guitar), when they started writing their own material. The band released their debut album No More Words through the independent record label Boa Records. Beside the three members, the album also featured Aleksandar Vujnov (bass guitar) and Nebojša Mitrović (drums).

The follow-up, the album Everything's Fine, featured the new drummer Branislav Đerić. Live versions of the songs from the first two studio albums were included on the third studio album Movement, released through PGP-RTS. The album also featured a cover version of the Madonna song "Erotica". The album was recorded with Dragan Živković (bass guitar) and Slobodan Levakov (drums).

In 2010, the band released their fourth studio album Explode for free download through the Exit Music record label.

In 2017, the band reactivated after longer hiatus, featuring new bass guitarist, Nemanja Konstantinović.

Overdrive has performed as an opening band for Pro-Pain, Soulfly, The Prodigy, Slayer, Korn, and other acts.

Discography

Studio albums 
 No More Words (1997)
 Everything's Fine (2000)
 Movement (2004)
 Explode (2010)

References 

 EX YU ROCK enciklopedija 1960–2006, Janjatović Petar;

External links 
 Official blog
 Overdrive at Myspace
 Overdrive at Facebook
 Overdrive at YouTube
 Official blog at Discogs

Serbian hardcore punk groups
Serbian heavy metal musical groups
Musical groups from Zrenjanin
Musical groups established in 1994